3460 or variant, may refer to:

In general
 A.D. 3460, a year in the 4th millennium CE
 3460 BC, a year in the 4th millennium BCE
 3460, a number in the 3000 (number) range

Other uses
 3460 Ashkova, an asteroid in the Asteroid Belt, the 3460th asteroid registered
 Texas Farm to Market Road 3460, a state highway
 Santa Fe class 3460, a class of steam locomotive

See also